Nazar Muhammad Khan Malik was a Pakistani athlete. He competed in the men's shot put and the men's discus throw at the 1948 Summer Olympics.

References

External links
 

Year of birth missing
Possibly living people
Athletes (track and field) at the 1948 Summer Olympics
Pakistani male shot putters
Pakistani male discus throwers
Olympic athletes of Pakistan
Place of birth missing